The Romagnolo or Asino Romagnolo is a breed of donkey from Emilia-Romagna in northern Italy. It is raised mainly in the province of Forlì-Cesena, but also the provinces of Metropolitan City of Bologna, and the provinces of Ravenna and Reggio Emilia. It is one of the eight autochthonous donkey breeds of limited distribution recognised by the Ministero delle Politiche Agricole Alimentari e Forestali, the Italian ministry of agriculture and forestry. The conservation status of the Romagnolo was listed as "critical" by the FAO in 2007.

References

Donkey breeds originating in Italy
Donkey breeds
Emilia-Romagna